The Ramaz School is an elite American coeducational Jewish Modern Orthodox day school which offers a dual curriculum of general studies taught in English and Judaic studies taught in Hebrew. The school is located on the Upper East Side of Manhattan in New York City. It consists of an early childhood center (nursery-kindergarten), a lower school (1st-4th grade), a middle school (5th-8th grade), and an upper school (9th-12th grade).

The Ramaz Upper School is a college preparatory program designed to develop an appreciation for and understanding of the intellectual disciplines that are part of western civilization. The Judaic studies curriculum provides an equally rigorous program through which the religious and cultural tradition of Judaism is both taught and experienced. It is located on East 78th Street, seven city blocks (0.5 km) away from the other two school buildings located on East 85th Street. Approximately fifty percent of the upper school student body advances from the Middle School. Students commute from the Bronx, Brooklyn, Queens, Westchester, and Nassau counties in New York; Stamford and New Haven in Connecticut; and metropolitan New Jersey. Some students attend on a weekly or less frequent basis, coming from more distant communities.

Ramaz was founded in 1937 and is affiliated with Congregation Kehilath Jeshurun ("KJ"), a synagogue located on East 85th Street which shares a building with the lower school and is across the street from the middle school. The congregation and its rabbi, Joseph Lookstein, helped to found and finance the school.

Architect James Rossant designed the modernist upper school building, completed in 1981.

The school has been featured in the Wall Street Journal for its exceptional acceptance rates into elite universities.

History
Founded in 1937 by Rabbi Joseph H. Lookstein through the generosity of New York lawyer and philanthropist Max J. Etra, Ramaz takes its name from the initials of Rabbi Moses Zevulun Margolies, the grandfather-in-law of Lookstein. The former principal, Rabbi Haskel Lookstein, is the son of Joseph Lookstein and was a member of the first class of six students.

Classes were held in many locations over the years, including the vestry rooms of Congregation Kehilath Jeshurun. After the closing of Finch College, Ramaz bought the college's campus and renovated the buildings.

In 2007, Joyce Villarin, a former nurse at the school, treated a child for an injury that he claimed his father caused. Villarin contacted the father who admitted to injuring his son. The Ramaz administration told Villarin not to report the incident to the police. Villarin did report this and was fired in 2008 because the school thought that she was "not a team player." Villarin sued the school in Manhattan Supreme Court in 2009, arguing that the state's Social Services Law obligated her to report the potential abuse. Under the law, school faculty are required to report to state authorities a suspicion that a child is being abused or mistreated.

On November 30, 2007, The Wall Street Journal listed Ramaz as one of the top schools for graduates entering the top eight universities in the country, with 10 out of a class of 100 (class of 2007) going to these schools.

In January 2009, the Wall Street Journal reported that Ramaz lost $6 million in the collapse of the Bernard Madoff investment scheme.

The Ramaz School had proposed a 28-story project to be built in place of the Lower School during 2008–2010. The building would have replaced the current school with a new building split into ten floors used by the school and topped by 18 floors of condominiums. Air rights of the adjoining synagogue would be transferred for use by the adjoining school/condo structure. The project may have had to be scaled back following a review by the City's Board of Standards & Appeals because the height is more than what is permitted at this site. The plans were withdrawn by the school in July 2008. However, due to a fire in the adjacent Congregation Kehilath Jeshurun building in July 2011, the Lower school began to undergo repairs and refurbishments for water damage. Since the building was not ready to welcome students that September, the Temple Emanu-El of New York and Park Avenue Synagogue volunteered their facilities for students until November 2011. On November 8, 2011, the Lower school reopened its doors.

Co-curricular activities and athletics
The Ramaz School's team name is the Ramaz Rams, and their logo is a Ram's head. Ramaz fields a number of competitive and recreational athletic teams throughout the school year. In the Upper School, there are varsity teams for both boys and girls in basketball, tennis, volleyball, and floor hockey; these teams compete in both the Yeshiva High School Athletic League and local independent school leagues. Ramaz also fields soccer, baseball, swim, table tennis, and track teams.

Ramaz's academic teams include their Mock Trial team, which competes in the New York State Bar Association's statewide competition and won the New York State competition in 2002 and the New York City competition four times. Ramaz's Model Congress team participates in the University of Pennsylvania and Princeton University Model Congress tournaments, and their Model UN team competes in the annual Yeshiva University National Model United Nations event. Additionally, Ramaz's College Bowl team participates in independent tournaments, their Math Team competes in the New York Math League and the Mandelbrot Competition, the Chess Club competes in the Yeshiva Chess League, the Science Olympiad team competes against 15 other New York and New Jersey schools in a competition administered by the Board of Jewish Education, and their Hidon HaTanakh and Torah Bowl teams compete against local Jewish Day Schools. Ramaz Upper School students have also succeeded in numerous academic competitions in both the arts and sciences, including the 2004–2005 Siemens Westinghouse Competition, the 2007 NCTE Achievement Awards in Writing, the Intel Science Competition, and the American Mathematics Competition. Ramaz's creative writing magazine, Parallax, has also consistently been awarded the gold medal from the Columbia Scholastic Press Association.

The Ramaz Upper School also has special interest clubs, including an Arabic Club, Coalition for the Homeless, an Israel Advocacy Club, and fine and performing arts clubs. Ramaz's business investment club (BIC) has produced some hedge fund managers. The Ramaz Chamber Choir has competed in national choral competitions, performed on CBS Sunday Morning News, and at the White House and is featured on the Best of Jewish A Cappella, Volume 3.

Notable alumni

 Adam Ferziger (born 1964), historian
 Ari Gold (1974-2021), pop singer and songwriter
 Shai Held (born 1971), rosh yeshiva of Mechon Hadar
 Isaac Herzog (born 1960), President of Israel, former Israeli Tourism Minister, Chairman of the Labor party, head of the opposition, and son of former Israeli President Chaim Herzog
 Matthew Hiltzik (born 1972), CEO and President of Hiltzik Strategies, a consulting and communications firm
 Sam Lassner (born 1992), also known as Prince Fox, DJ and producer
 Nathan Lewin, attorney
 Natasha Lyonne (born 1979), actress in Orange Is the New Black and creator of Russian Doll.
 Leandra Medine (born 1988), fashion blogger/designer
 Daphne Merkin (born 1954), author and journalist
 J. Ezra Merkin (born 1953), former money manager and Bernie Madoff affiliate
 Peter N. Miller (born 1964), historian and academic
 Michael Mukasey (born 1941), the 81st United States Attorney General
 Haviva Ner-David
 Achinoam Nini (born 1969), Israeli rock singer
 Sam Nunberg (born 1981), Former advisor to Donald Trump
 Joshua Prager (1971), author and journalist
 Michael Recanati (1957–2015), businessman and philanthropist
 Philippe Reines (born 1969), Deputy Assistant Secretary of State, and spokesman for Secretary of State Hillary Clinton
 Baruch Shemtov (born 1987), fashion designer
 Adam Szubin, Acting United States Treasury Secretary
 Larry Tanz (born 1970), VP at Netflix
 Merryl Tisch, New York State Schools Chancellor (through 2015)
 Tevi Troy, Deputy Secretary of the United States Department of Health and Human Services
 David Twersky (journalist) (1950–2010), journalist, Zionist activist, and peace advocate
Elisha Wiesel (born 1972), American businessman; chief information officer of Goldman Sachs
 Elizabeth Wurtzel (1967–2020), author of Prozac Nation

References

External links

Kehilath Jeshurun
Data for Ramaz School, National Center for Education Statistics
The Ramaz Upper School is located along East 78th Street: . The Lower and Middle School buildings are located further uptown, on East 85th Street: 

Educational institutions established in 1937
Private K-12 schools in Manhattan
Modern Orthodox Jewish day schools in the United States
Upper East Side
Orthodox Judaism in New York City
Jewish day schools in New York (state)
Jews and Judaism in Manhattan
1937 establishments in New York City